Georgi Ventsislavov Milanov (born 19 February 1992) is a Bulgarian professional footballer who plays for UAE Pro League club Al Dhafra and the Bulgarian national team as a central midfielder. His twin brother Iliya Milanov plays as a defender.

Club career

Litex Lovech

Born in Levski, Pleven Province, Milanov began playing football at the local club, before joined the Litex Lovech Academy, together with his twin brother Iliya, in 2005. He was part of a group of young players at the club who guided the club to win the Bulgarian U-17 Championship in June 2009, with Milanov scoring in the final against Levski Sofia. 
 
On 1 August 2009, Milanov made his first team debut, at 17 years 152 days, coming off the bench in the 2009 Bulgarian Supercup against Levski Sofia, which ended in a 1–0 defeat at Vasil Levski National Stadium. A week later, he made his league debut against Lokomotiv Mezdra, scoring the opening goal in a 5–0 victory. On 3 December, he scored his first ever Bulgarian Cup goal, in a 4–0 win over Pirin Gotse Delchev which sent them through to the 1/8 finals. Milanov play regularly in his first season, making 31 appearances in all competitions and collected his first A PFG title winner's medal at the end of the 2009–10 season.

On 14 August 2010, in a 2–1 home victory over Pirin Blagoevgrad, Milanov netted his first goal of 2010–11 season. He ended his second season with 5 goals in 36 appearances in all competitions. Milanov helped Litex retain the A PFG title by a 3-point margin after being pushed by Levski Sofia for much of the season.

In 2011–12 season, Milanov scored 6 goals in 25 league matches. On 24 May 2012, he was credited with the ABF A PFG Young Player of the Season award, by the professional footballers association of Bulgaria.

On 19 August 2012, Milanov scored his first goal of 2012–13 season in a 1–1 away draw against Lokomotiv Plovdiv. On 27 October, he scored his first ever hat-trick in the A PFG, against Montana, in a 3–1 victory at Ogosta Stadium; he scored from a penalty kick and a two free-kicks. On 27 December 2012, he became the youngest ever recipient of the Bulgarian Footballer of the Year award. On 30 March 2013, as a result of injuries to regular captains Nebojša Jelenković and Nikolay Bodurov, Milanov captained Litex for the first time against Botev Vratsa in a 5–1 home win. On 14 April, he played his 100th match for Litex in the league in a 2–1 away loss against Slavia Sofia.

CSKA Moscow
On 5 July 2013, Milanov signed with Russian Premier League side CSKA Moscow on a five-year deal for an initial fee of 5,4 million leva, with a further 2 million leva depending on CSKA appearances in the UEFA competitions in the next two years. He was given the number 23 jersey. He made his official debut on 18 August 2013, in the 1–0 home win over Kuban Krasnodar in a league match after coming on as a late substitute for Keisuke Honda. Although having had trouble fitting into the club at start, Milanov is improving at a fast rate according to head coach Leonid Slutsky, resulting in him becoming a regular starter plus in him receiving playing time in important European matches in the group stages of the 2013–14 UEFA Champions League. He provided his first assist in a 4–1 home win over Terek Grozny; it was the opening goal of the match netted by teammate Seydou Doumbia.

Milanov scored his first official goal for CSKA Moscow in a game against FC Zenit Saint Petersburg on 16 March 2014 – a long range effort that eventually won the game for his team; being the only goal scored in the whole match. His classy goal didn't go unnoticed, as he was voted player of the week for matchday 21 in the Russian Premier League.

For the 2016–17 season, Milanov received the number 8 jersey upon his return from Grasshopper. He scored his first goal of the season in a 0–1 away win against FC Ural, saving his team from a 0–0 draw in the last seconds of the game.

Upon the expiration of his contract at the end of the 2017–18 season, he left CSKA as a free agent.

Grasshoppers loan
On 16 February 2016, CSKA Moscow announced that Milanov had joined Swiss Super League side Grasshopper Club Zürich on loan for the remainder of the season.

Fehérvár
On 3 September 2018, he joined Hungarian club Fehérvár FC. He made his debut on 15 September in a 2–1 away loss against Puskás Akadémia FC. He scored his first goal for the club on 23 September in a 0–2 win against Cigánd SE, in a match for the Magyar Kupa. On 8 November 2018, he scored the only goal in a 1–0 home win against PAOK in a Europa League match.

On 21 July 2020, Milanov left Fehérvár on mutual agreement.

Levski Sofia
After more than a year without a club, Milanov joined Levski Sofia on 29 July 2021, signing a one-year contract with the club.

International career

Milanov was called up to the Bulgaria under-21 team for the first time in February 2010, making his competitive debut on 3 March, in a 0–2 loss against Montenegro U21.

Milanov was called up to the senior Bulgaria squad for the first time in September 2011, and made his full international debut in a friendly against Ukraine at Valeriy Lobanovskyi Dynamo Stadium on 7 October, playing 24 minutes as a substitute of a 3–0 loss for Bulgaria. On 7 September 2012, Milanov scored his first international goal in a 2–2 home draw against Italy during 2014 FIFA World Cup qualifying.

On 28 March 2015 Milanov made an assist for the Bulgarian national team during the 2–2 draw with Italy.

Career statistics

Club

International

International goals

Honours

Club
Litex
 Bulgarian A PFG (2): 2009–10, 2010–11
 Bulgarian Supercup (1): 2010

CSKA Moscow
 Russian Premier League (2): 2013–14, 2015–16
 Russian Super Cup (2): 2013, 2014

MOL Vidi
 Magyar Kupa (1): 2018–19

Levski Sofia
 Bulgarian Cup (1): 2021–22

Individual
Bulgarian Footballer of the Year : 2012
A PFG Player of the Year: 2012

References

External links

 Profile at CSKA Moscow official website
 
 

1992 births
Living people
Bulgarian footballers
People from Levski, Pleven Province
Bulgaria international footballers
Bulgaria under-21 international footballers
Bulgaria youth international footballers
PFC Litex Lovech players
First Professional Football League (Bulgaria) players
Association football midfielders
Bulgarian twins
Twin sportspeople
Bulgarian expatriate footballers
Expatriate footballers in Russia
Expatriate footballers in Switzerland
Expatriate footballers in Hungary
Bulgarian expatriates in Hungary
PFC CSKA Moscow players
Grasshopper Club Zürich players
Fehérvár FC players
Russian Premier League players
Swiss Super League players
Nemzeti Bajnokság I players